Y Dydd ("The Day") was a weekly liberal Welsh language newspaper established by Samuel Roberts in 1868 that was distributed in North Wales. Y Dydd contained general political and religious news and opinions.

The paper briefly merged with the Tyst Cymreig to form Tyst a'r Dydd; however, it reverted to Y Dydd a year later. In 1954, Y Dydd merged with Corwen Chronicle and Border Advertiser.  In 1992, Y Dydd again became a separate publication. It ceased publication in June of 2017.

Y Dydd was published by William Hughes. Associated titles: Tyst Cymreig (1870); Tyst a'r Dydd (1871); Corwen Chronicle and Border Advertiser (1954); Y Dydd a'r Corwen Chronicle (1954).

References

Newspapers published in Wales
Publications established in 1868
1868 establishments in Wales